Lee Hyeong-U (born 13 October 1942) is a South Korean weightlifter. He competed in the men's light heavyweight event at the 1964 Summer Olympics.

References

1942 births
Living people
South Korean male weightlifters
Olympic weightlifters of South Korea
Weightlifters at the 1964 Summer Olympics
Place of birth missing (living people)
Asian Games medalists in weightlifting
Asian Games gold medalists for South Korea
Weightlifters at the 1966 Asian Games
Medalists at the 1966 Asian Games
20th-century South Korean people
21st-century South Korean people